Dahm may refer to:

 Dahm (surname), list of people with the surname
 Dahm House, historic townhouse in Mobile, Alabama
 Dahm, Iran, village
 Dahman, a Zoroastrian concept

See also
 Dahms, surname
 Dam, a barrier that impounds water
 Dahme (disambiguation)